S.S. Pennarossa is a Sanmarinese football club, based in Chiesanuova. The club was founded in 1968. Pennarossa currently plays in Girone A of Campionato Sammarinese di Calcio. The team's colors are red and white.

Honours
Campionato Sammarinese di Calcio: 1
 2003–04
Coppa Titano: 2
 2003, 2004
San Marino Federal Trophy: 1
 2003

Current squad
Updated as of 17 May 2022

European record

External links
Official home page
FSGC page
Team Squad

 
Association football clubs established in 1968
Football clubs in San Marino
Former Italian football clubs
1968 establishments in San Marino